Iyiora Anam is one of the towns in Anam City,  Anambra West Local Government Area of Anambra State, southeastern Nigeria. Iyiora is the eldest in Anam and the smallest town in Anam, Anambra West of Anambra State.

Economy 
The main occupation of Iyiora people is trading and farming. They depends mainly on agriculture and commerce for their daily livelihood.

The location of the town within the tropical rainforest gives it the ecological basis for production of a wide range of tropical agricultural crops with widespread potential for industrial conventions. Most Iyioras have out-station gardens where they usually cultivate their farm products. The prime cash crops include groundnut, maize, pepper, melon, etc. Food crops such as yam, cassava, potato and cocoyam are also produced in large quantities.

Fish Catching 
Iyiora people do know how to catch fish a lot. Fish are normally caught in the wild and water. Techniques for catching fish include hand gathering, spearing, netting, angling and trapping. Iyiora is among the towns that is catching fish in Ezichi river and other rivers in Anam city and other Ananbra state rivers.

Marriage 
Iyiora Anam sees marriage as a happy life for couples to enjoy together. It is also for procreation, carrying out economic activities together and joint ownership of wealth and investments. Have everything together.

Obanwa 
This is the first formal ceremony performed by would-be parents-in-law after proposal. The parent of the young man takes ego ise (five naira) and some drinks to the girl's parents to declare their intention. At this point, if accepted the girl is betrothed to the young man.

Oli Iyi 
This is the final marriage rite performed at the eldest man's house; it's after this ceremony that the girl goes to the man's house.

References 
 Anam People's Website

Towns in Anambra State